What Do the Stars Say to You is a studio album by American house producer Ron Trent, released by Night Time Stories on June 24, 2022. Released under his new project WARM, What Do the Stars Say to You is his first LP since Raw Footage, which was released in 2011.

The album features collaborations with Khruangbin, Gigi Masin, Azymuth's Ivan Conti and Alex Malheriros, Jean-Luc Ponty, Venecia, and Lars Bartkuhn.

Critical reception
Pitchforks Ben Cardew gave the album a 7.2 rating out of 10, describing it as "a record of gentle rewards, gradual discovery." The Arts Desks Barney Harsent rated the album four out of five stars, calling it "a smooth-as-silk success." Oscar Henson rated the album eight out of ten in his review for Crack magazine, saying, "What Do the Stars Say to You is the sound of a modern master putting his mark on the music that raised him." Resident Advisors Annabel Ross called it "an album of deep, relaxing grooves that sparkle with expert musicianship."

Track listing

Vinyl
A1. "Cool Water" feat. Ivan Conti (Azymuth) and Lars Bartkuhn
A2. "Cycle of Many"
A3. "Admira" feat. Gigi Masin
A4. "Flowers" feat. Venecia
A5. "Melt Into You" feat. Alex Malheiros (Azymuth)
B1. "Flos Potentia (Sugar, Cotton, Tabacco)" feat. Khruangbin
B2. "Sphere" feat. Jean-Luc Ponty
B3. "WARM"
B4. "On My Way Home"
B5. "What Do the Stars Say to You"

CD
The CD contains a continuous mix by François Kevorkian, which includes five bonus tracks:
"Melt Into You" feat. Alex Malheiros (Azymuth)
"Cool Water" feat. Ivan Conti (Azymuth) and Lars Bartkuhn
"Flos Potentia (Sugar, Cotton, Tabacco)" feat. Khruangbin
"The Ride"
"Cycle of Many"
"In the Summer When We Were Young"
"Flowers" feat. Venecia
"Sphere" feat. Jean-Luc Ponty
"Admira" feat. Gigi Masin
"Endless Love"
"Rocking You"
"WARM"
"On My Way Home"
"What Do the Stars Say to You"
"Cool Water Interlude"

Personnel
 Ron Trent – drums, percussion, keys, synths, piano, guitar and electronics
 François K – mastering

References

External sources
 What Do the Stars Say to You at Night Time Stories

2022 albums
Night Time Stories albums